State Highway 275 (SH 275) is a Texas state highway running along the northern side of Galveston Island from Interstate 45 to SH 87.

Route description
SH 275 begins at a junction with I-45 in Galveston. It initially heads north, but turns towards the east as it heads through Galveston. SH 275 reaches its eastern terminus at a junction with SH 87 in Galveston. The highway is also known as Harborside Drive.

History
SH 275 was originally designated on August 1, 1938 on a route from Mabelle to Jimtown. This was cancelled on November 24, 1941. The current route was designated on February 23, 1993.

Major junctions

References

275
Transportation in Galveston, Texas
Transportation in Galveston County, Texas